Technological University, Loikaw is in part 260, Pangan village track, in the east of Ywatan Shay village, Loikaw Township, Kayah State, Myanmar. It offers graduate and undergraduate degrees in several different engineering disciplines. It received ISO(9001/2008) in 2016.

History
TU (Loikaw) was initially established as Government Technical High School on 30 July 1982. Then, it was promoted to Government Technical Institute on 1 December 1998. It was upgraded to Government Technological College on 10 September 2001. It was promoted to Technological University on 20 January 2007.

Aims and duties

Vision
 To produce internationally qualified engineers to meet society's needs.
 To become internationally recognized university.

Mission
 To develop human resources by producing qualified engineers to meet local and global need and challenges.
 To provide state development getting opportunity of studying engineering subjects to increase job opportunity for the youth in the state.

Departments
Civil Engineering Department
Electronics and Communication Engineering Department
Electrical Power Engineering Department
Mechanical Power Engineering Department
Engineering Supporting Department
Administrative Department

Programs
Due to the new program of MOST, the university offers only Bachelor of Engineering in the 2014–2015 academic year.

The former programs.

Gallery

Project

See also 
List of universities in Myanmar
List of Technological Universities in Myanmar

References

External links 

Technological universities in Myanmar
Kayah State